(Glory be to God in the Highest), 197a (197.1), is a Christmas cantata by Johann Sebastian Bach. He composed it in Leipzig for the First Day of Christmas in 1728 or 1729.

History and text 
Bach composed the work in Leipzig for Christmas Day in 1728 or 1729. The prescribed readings for the feast day were from the Epistle of Titus, "God's mercy appeared" or from Isaiah, "Unto us a child is born", and from the Gospel of Luke, the Nativity, Annunciation to the shepherds and the angels' song. The text of the cantata is by Picander. The chorale is from the 1697 hymn "Ich freue mich in dir" by Caspar Ziegler. Bach later revised the piece into Gott ist unsre Zuversicht, BWV 197.2.

Scoring and structure 
The cantata is scored for solo alto and bass voices, a four-part choir, two flutes, oboe d'amore, two violins, viola, bassoon, cello, and continuo.

The piece has seven movements (although there may also have been an opening sinfonia):
Chorus: 
Aria: 
Recitative: 
Aria: 
Recitative: 
Aria: 
Chorale:

Music 
Only the last four movements of the piece are extant.

The nineteen surviving bars of the fourth movement, an alto aria, demonstrate a rare bassoon obbligati and assume a combined ritornello-ternary form.

The fifth movement is a bass recitative with only continuo accompaniment. It is a "harmonically adventurous", "forceful little movement marked by a robust melodic line".

The following bass aria is accompanied by oboe d'amore and continuo, and is a "jaunty, pastoral dance" in 6/8 time and ritornello-ternary form. The movement is notable for a long rising melisma omitted from the reworked version in BWV 197.2.

Musicologist Julian Mincham suggests that the chorale is "one of the sturdiest in the repertoire".

Recordings 
The recordings are taken from the listing on Bach-Cantatas:
 Gächinger Kantorei / Bach-Collegium Stuttgart, Helmuth Rilling. Edition Bachakademie Vol. 140. Hänssler, 1999.
 Bach Collegium Japan, Masaaki Suzuki. J. S. Bach: Cantatas Vol. 54. BIS, 2012.

References

External links 
 
 Ehre sei Gott in der Höhe BWV 197a; BC A 11 / Sacred cantata (1st Christmas Day): Leipzig University
 BWV 197a Ehre sei Gott in der Höhe: English translation, University of Vermont
 Luke Dahn: BWV 197a.7 bach-chorales.com

Church cantatas by Johann Sebastian Bach
1728 compositions
Christmas cantatas